Phil Lawrence (born 17 March 1945) is a British former sports shooter. He competed in the 50 metre rifle, prone event at the 1972 Summer Olympics.

References

1945 births
Living people
British male sport shooters
Olympic shooters of Great Britain
Shooters at the 1972 Summer Olympics
Place of birth missing (living people)